An EMD SW1200 is a 4 axle diesel switcher locomotive built by General Motors Electro-Motive Division between January 1954 and May 1966. Power is provided by an EMD 567C 12-cylinder engine which generates . Additional SW1200 production was completed by General Motors Diesel in Ontario, Canada, between September 1955 and June 1964.

737 examples of this locomotive model were built for U.S. railroads, 287 were built for Canadian railroads, 4 were built for Brazilian railroads, 25 were built for a Chilean industrial firm, and 3 were built for the Panama Canal Railway.

Design and production 
The SW1200 was the third model of 1,200 hp SW series switchers built by EMD. It was a successor to the SW7 and SW9. Compared to its direct predecessor, the SW9, the SW1200 differed in that it used the improved and more reliable 567C engine, compared to the SW9's 567B engine. Late SW1200s built in 1966 were instead built with the 567E 12-cylinder engine. Most of the locomotive's external features were unchanged from the SW9, making distinguishing between the two models difficult.

SW1200 production began in January 1954, immediately after SW9 production came to an end the previous month. Production continued for 12 years until the last SW1200 left EMD's manufacturing facility in May 1966.

Like many EMD products, customers could customize their SW1200 orders. Several types of trucks were available, including Flexicoil trucks and the standard Blomberg B trucks. A few units were built with dynamic brakes, featuring a large square box with a fan on top of the hood, right in front of the cab.

Variants 
A cow-calf variation, the TR12, was cataloged, but none were built.

An SW1200RS (RS for Road Switcher) is a variation of the standard SW1200 that features large front and rear (on some units) numberboard housings, EMD Flexicoil B-B trucks, and larger fuel tanks for road switcher service. The majority of the Canadian National and Canadian Pacific SW1200 fleets were purchased as SW1200RS units. SW1200RS units were produced near the end of SW1200 production in the mid-1960s.

Original buyers

Units built by Electro-Motive Division, USA

Units built by General Motors Diesel, Canada

Surviving and preserved units 

Fremont and Elkhorn Valley Railroad 1219 built in March 1962 for Chicago & North Western is utilized for their excursion trains as well as the Fremont Dinner Train and currently pulls 1920s-era passenger cars for their non-profit excursion operations and the for-profit dinner train cars.

See also 
EMD LWT12
List of GMD Locomotives
List of GM-EMD locomotives

References

 
 
 
 

SW1200
SW1200
B-B locomotives
Diesel-electric locomotives of the United States
Railway locomotives introduced in 1954
Standard gauge locomotives of the United States
Standard gauge locomotives of Canada
Standard gauge locomotives of Brazil
5 ft gauge locomotives
Metre gauge diesel locomotives
Diesel-electric locomotives of Canada
Diesel-electric locomotives of Brazil
Shunting locomotives